The River Calder is a river mainly within Renfrewshire, Scotland.

River course 

The river rises in the hills to the west of the county and for some of its length forms the border between Renfrewshire and its neighbouring council areas of North Ayrshire and Inverclyde. The only significant settlement which the river runs through is Lochwinnoch, before flowing into the nearby Castle Semple Loch which drains into the Black Cart Water.

References

External links
 Photograph of the river on Geograph

Calder, Renfrewshire